The Green-Eyed Monsters is a Big Finish Productions audio drama featuring Lisa Bowerman as Bernice Summerfield, a character from the spin-off media based on the long-running British science fiction television series Doctor Who.

Plot 
Bernice gets caught up in the machinations of psychotic Lady Ashantra du Lac as Jason and Adrian try to babysit Peter.

Cast
Bernice Summerfield - Lisa Bowerman
Jason Kane - Stephen Fewell
Adrian Wall - Harry Myers
Joseph the Porter - Steven Wickham
Lady Ashantra du Lac - Maria Darling

External links
Big Finish Productions - Professor Bernice Summerfield: The Green-Eyed Monsters

Bernice Summerfield audio plays
Fiction set in the 27th century